James Richard Hallahan (4 June 1878 – 1 July 1964) was an Australian rules footballer with the St Kilda Football Club in the Victorian Football League.

Hallahan played 2 games for St Kilda in 1904.

Hallahan's son Jim played with Fitzroy in the 1940s and his son Tom also played with St Kilda.

References

External links

1878 births
1964 deaths
Australian rules footballers from Victoria (Australia)
Australian Rules footballers: place kick exponents
St Kilda Football Club players
Rutherglen Football Club players